This is a list of nature centres and environmental education centres in the state of South Carolina.

To use the sortable tables: click on the icons at the top of each column to sort that column in alphabetical order; click again for reverse alphabetical order.

Resources
 Environmental Education in South Carolina

External links
 Map of nature centers and environmental education centers in South Carolina

 
Nature centers
South Carolina